Deportivo Siquinala is a Guatemalan football club from Siquinalá, Escuintla Department.
It was founded in 2004 and currently plays at the Primera División de Ascenso, second tier on their football.

Current squad

List of coaches
  Kenny Colindres (June 2016 -May 2017)
  César Balcárce (June 2017-Aug 2017)
  Jairo Pérez (Aug 2017-Dec 2017)
  Daniel Berta (Dec 2017- Oct 2018)
  Otto Rodríguez (Oct 2018-)

References 

http://el.soccerway.com/teams/guatemala/siquinala/36523/
http://www.fedefutguate.org

Football clubs in Guatemala
Association football clubs established in 2004